The Crocodile Islands are a group of islands belonging to the Yan-nhaŋu people of the Northern Territory of Australia. They are located off the coast of Arnhem Land in the Arafura Sea.

List of islands

Larger islands
 Milingimbi Island, in the local language Yurruwi, is the largest of the inner islands in the group
 Murrungga (Mooroongga), the largest of the outer Crocodile islands, and the birthplace of Laurie Baymarrwangga, the last fluent speaker of Yan-nhangu.
 Rapuma (Yabooma)
 Gananggananggarr (Gananggaringur)
 Nilpaywa (Crocodile Island).

Smaller islands
 Darbada.
 Boojiragi (Budjirriki)
 Mardanaingura.
 Northwest Crocodile (Gurriba)
 North-east Crocodile Islands (Brul-brul)
 North-west Crocodile Reef (Gununba No 1).

History
The islands were formed by stabilising sea levels 5000 years before present. They were discovered by the Dutch in the seventeenth century and named the Crocodils Eÿlandt.  Several of the Crocodile Islands, with their associated mudflats, have been identified by BirdLife International as forming the Milingimbi Islands Important Bird Area (IBA) because they support large numbers of waders, or shorebirds. Murrungga Island has one of the most significant migratory bird nesting and breeding sites in the North of Australia.  The enormous fresh water lakes of Garratha, Riyanhuna and Ganbuwa are home to hundreds of species of birds, as well as a large population of Saltwater Crocodiles, after which the islands are named.

Access
Access to the islands is restricted; before visiting, permission must be sought from the appropriate land council.

See also
 List of islands of Australia

Notes

Citations

Sources

Arnhem Land
Important Bird Areas of the Northern Territory
Islands of the Northern Territory